Dim sum is a large range of small Cantonese dishes that are traditionally enjoyed in restaurants for brunch. Most modern dim sum dishes are commonly associated with Cantonese cuisine, although dim sum dishes also exist in other Chinese cuisines. In the tenth century, when the city of Canton (Guangzhou) began to experience an increase in commercial travel, many frequented teahouses for small-portion meals with tea called "yum cha" (brunch). "Yum cha" includes two related concepts. The first is "jat zung loeng gin", which translates literally as "one cup, two pieces". This refers to the custom of serving teahouse customers two delicately made food items, savory or sweet, to complement their tea. The second is dim sum, which translates literally to "touch the heart", the term used to designate the small food items that accompanied the tea.

Teahouse owners gradually added various snacks called dim sum to their offerings. The practice of having tea with dim sum eventually evolved into the modern "yum cha". Cantonese dim sum culture developed rapidly during the latter half of the nineteenth century in Guangzhou. Cantonese dim sum was originally based on local foods. As dim sum continued to develop, chefs introduced influences and traditions from other regions of China. Cantonese dim sum has a very broad range of flavors, textures, cooking styles, and ingredients, and can be classified into regular items, seasonal offerings, weekly specials, banquet dishes, holiday dishes, house signature dishes, travel-friendly items, as well as breakfast or lunch foods and late-night snacks.

There are over one thousand dim sum dishes originating from Guangdong alone, a total that no other area in China comes even close to matching. In fact, the cookbooks of most Chinese food cultures tend to lump their own variations on dim sum dishes with other local snacks. But that is not the case with Cantonese dim sum, which has developed into a separate branch of cuisine. Some estimates claim that there are at least two thousand types of dim sum in total across China, and about forty to fifty types are commonly sold outside of China. 

Dim sum restaurants typically have a wide variety of dishes, usually totaling several dozen. The tea is very important, just as important as the food. Many Cantonese restaurants serve dim sum as early as five in the morning, while more traditional restaurants typically serve dim sum until mid-afternoon. Dim sum restaurants have a unique serving method where servers offer dishes to customers from steam-heated carts. It is now commonplace for restaurants to serve dim sum at dinner and sell various dim sum items à la carte for takeout. In addition to traditional dim sum, some chefs also create and prepare new fusion-based dim sum dishes. There are also variations designed for visual appeal on social media, such as dumplings and buns made to resemble animals.

Etymology 
The original meaning of the term "dim sum" remains unclear and contested. Some references state that the term originated in the Eastern Jin dynasty (317 AD–420 AD). According to one legend, to show soldiers gratitude after battles, a general had civilians make buns and cakes to send to the front lines.

Some versions date the legend to the Southern Song dynasty (960–1279) after the term's earliest attestation in the Book of Tang. Written in the Five Dynasties and Ten Kingdoms period (907–979), the book uses dim sum as a verb instead: 「治妝未畢, 我未及餐, 爾且可點心」(), which translates to "I have not finished preparing myself and am not ready for a proper meal; therefore, you can treat yourself to some small snacks." In this context, "dim sum" means "to barely fill your stomach". Dim sum dishes are usually associated with "yum cha", which is known as the Cantonese brunch tradition.  Chinese food historian Yan-kit So has described dim sum as:Literally translated as "so close to the heart", they are, in reality, a large range of hors d'oeuvres Cantonese people traditionally enjoy in restaurants (previously teahouses) for breakfast and for lunch but never for dinner, washed down with tea. "Let's go yum cha." is understood among the Cantonese to mean going to a restaurant for dim sum; such is the twin linkage between the food and the beverage.

Cuisine 
There are at least two thousand types of dim sum in total across China, and over one thousand available in Guangdong alone. Dim sum are usually eaten as breakfast or brunch. Cantonese dim sum has a very broad range of flavors, textures, cooking styles, and ingredients, and can be classified into regular items, seasonal offerings, weekly specials, banquet dishes, holiday dishes, house signature dishes, travel-friendly, as well as breakfast or lunch foods and late night snacks.

The subtropical climate of the southeast quadrant of Guangdong partly influences dim sum's portion size. It can cause a decrease in appetite, so that people prefer eating scaled-down meals throughout the day rather than the customary three large meals. Teahouses in Guangzhou served "three teas and two meals", which included lunch and dinner, and breakfast, afternoon and evening teas with dim sum.

Many dim sum dishes are made of seafood, chopped meats, or vegetables wrapped in dough or thin wrappings and steamed, deep-fried, or pan-fried. A traditional dim sum brunch includes various types of steamed buns, such as cha siu bao (a steamed bun filled with barbecue pork), rice or wheat dumplings, and rice noodle rolls that contain a range of ingredients, including beef, chicken, pork, prawns, and vegetarian options. Many dim sum restaurants also offer plates of steamed green vegetables, stuffed eggplant, stuffed green peppers, roasted meats, congee and other soups. Dessert dim sum is also available and can be ordered at any time since there is not a set sequence for the meal.

It is customary to order "family-style", sharing the small dishes consisting of three or four pieces of dim sum among all members of the dining party. Small portion sizes allow people to try a wide variety of food.

Dishes 
Dim sum restaurants typically have a wide variety of dishes, usually several dozen.

Dumplings

Rolls

Buns

Cakes

Meats

Seafood

Vegetables

Rice

Desserts

Tea 

Tea is considered to be very important, so much so that it is considered just as important as the food itself. Teas served during dim sum include:

 Chrysanthemum tea: instead of tea leaves, it is a flower-based tisane (herbal tea) made from flowers of the species Chrysanthemum morifolium or Chrysanthemum indicum, which are the most popular in East Asia. To prepare the tea, chrysanthemum flowers (usually dried) are steeped in hot water (usually  after cooling from a boil) in a teapot, cup, or glass. A common mix with  pu-erh is called guk pou from its component teas.
 Green tea: freshly picked leaves that go through heating and drying processes but not oxidation, so keep their original green color and chemical compounds, like polyphenols and chlorophyll. Produced all over China, and the most popular category of tea, green teas include the representative Dragon Well and Biluochun from Zhejiang and Jiangsu provinces, respectively.
 Oolong tea: partially oxidizing the tea leaves imparts them with characteristics of both green and black teas. Oolong teas are close in taste to green than black tea, yet have less of a "grassy" taste. Major oolong-tea producing areas such as Fujian, Guangdong, and Taiwan line the southeastern coast of China. Tieguanyin or Ti Kuan Yin: one of the most popular, originated in Fujian province and is a premium variety with a delightful fragrance.
  Pounei (Cantonese) or pu-erh tea (Mandarin): usually a compressed tea, pu-erh has unique, earthy notes derived from years of fermentation.
 Scented teas: various mixes of flowers with green, black, or oolong teas exist. Flowers used include jasmine, gardenia, magnolia, grapefruit flower,  sweet-scented osmanthus and rose. Strict rules govern the proportion of flowers to tea. Jasmine tea, the most popular scented tea, is the one most often served at "yum cha" establishments.

The tea service includes several customs. Typically, the server starts by asking diners which tea to serve. According to etiquette, the person closest to the tea pot pours tea for the others. Sometimes, a younger person will serve an older person.

Those receiving tea express thanks by tapping their index and middle fingers twice on the table. According to one legend, the finger-tapping tradition evolved from an incident when an emperor poured tea for his servant in a public teahouse during a trip where the emperor concealed his identity to mingle with the commoners. Having been instructed by the emperor to not expose his identity to the public, the servant showed gratitude by improvising the finger-tapping gesture instead of what should have been a kowtow, which would have betrayed the emperor's noble status. The practice gradually evolved to represent gratitude for having tea poured by others.

Diners also flip open the lid (of hinged metal tea pots) or offset the tea pot cover (on ceramic tea pots) to signal an empty pot; servers will then refill the pot.

History 

Dim sum is part of the Chinese tradition of snacks originating from the Song dynasty (960–1279), when royal chefs created various dishes such as minced pheasant, lark tongue, and desserts made from steamed milk and bean paste. Guangzhou experienced an increase in commercial travel in the tenth century  At that time, travelers would frequent teahouses for small-portion meals with tea called "yum cha" or "tea" meals. Yum cha includes two related concepts. The first, translates literally as "one cup, two pieces". This refers to the custom of serving teahouse customers two delicately made food items, savory or sweet, to complement their tea. The second, which means dim sum, translates literally to "touch the heart" (i.e., heart touching). This is the term used to designate the small food items that accompanied the drinking of tea.

During the thirteenth century, when the Mongols invaded China, the royal court fled to southern China, bringing a royal influence to the dim sum of Guangzhou. Guangzhou was a wealthy, large port city that had international visitors, a temperate climate, and a coastline where fresh and tropical ingredients were grown, resulting in an ideal environment for food and entertainment. In Guangzhou, street vendors and teahouses sold dim sum. The practice of having tea with dim sum at tea houses eventually evolved into modern yum cha. While at the teahouses, travelers selected their preferred snacks from carts. Visitors to tea houses often socialized as they ate, and business people negotiated deals over dim sum.

During the Ming dynasty (1368–1644), the Tea and Horses Bureau was established to monitor tea production and improve tea quality. The improvements in tea quality also led to teahouse improvements.

Cantonese dim sum culture developed rapidly during the latter half of the nineteenth century in Guangzhou. Teahouse dining areas were typically located upstairs, and initial dim sum fare included steamed buns. Eventually, these evolved into specialized dim sum restaurants, and the variety and quality of dim sum dishes rapidly followed suit. Cantonese dim sum was originally based on local foods such as sweet roast pork called "char siu" and fresh rice noodles. As dim sum continued to develop, chefs introduced influences and traditions from other regions of China, which created a starting point for the wide variety of dim sum available today. Chefs created a large range of dim sum that even today comprises most of a teahouse's dim sum offerings. Part of this development included reducing portion sizes of larger dishes originally from northern China, such as stuffed steamed buns, so they could easily be incorporated into the dim sum menu. The rapid growth in dim sum restaurants was due partly because people found the preparation of dim sum dishes to be time-consuming and preferred the convenience of dining out and eating a large variety of baked, steamed, pan-fried, deep-fried, and braised foods. Dim sum continued to develop and also spread southward to Hong Kong.

Although dim sum is normally considered Cantonese, it includes many additional influences. Over thousands of years, as people in China migrated in search of different places to live, they carried the recipes of their favorite foods and continued to prepare and serve these dishes. Many Han Chinese migrated south, seeking warmer climates. Settlements took shape in the Yangtze River Valley, the central highlands, and the coastal southeast, including Guangdong. The influence of Suzhou and Hangzhou is found in vegetarian soy skin rolls and pearl meatballs. The dessert squares flavored with red dates or wolfberries are influenced by Beijing desserts. Savory dishes, such as pot stickers and steamed dumplings, include Muslim influences because of people traveling from Central Asia across the Silk Road and into Guangdong. These are just a few examples of how a wide range of influences became incorporated into traditional Cantonese dim sum.

By 1860, foreign influences had to shape Guangdong's dim sum with culinary innovations such as ketchup, Worcestershire sauce, and curry, all of which came to be used in some savory dishes. Custard pies evolved into the miniature classics found in every teahouse. Other dim sum dishes evolved from Indian samosas, mango puddings, and Mexican conchas (snow-topped buns). Cantonese-style dim sum has an extremely broad range of tastes, textures, cooking styles, and ingredients. As a result, there are more than a thousand different varieties of dim sum.

During the 1920s, in Guangzhou, the foremost places to enjoy tea were its tea pavilions, which had refined and expansive surroundings. The customers were wealthy, and there were rather high standards for the privilege of enjoying tea pavilion service and dim sum. Upon entering a tea pavilion, customers would inspect tea leaves to ensure their quality and to verify the water temperature. Once satisfied, these guests were presented with a pencil and a booklet listing the available dim sum. A waiter would then tear their orders out of the booklet so that the kitchen could pan-fry, steam, bake, or deep-fry these dishes on demand. Customers dined upstairs in privacy and comfort. Servers carefully balanced the dishes on their arms or arranged them on trays as they climbed up and down the stairs. Eventually, dim sum carts were used to serve the steamers and plates.

People with average incomes also enjoyed tea and dim sum. Early every morning, customers visited inexpensive restaurants that offered filled steamed buns and hot tea. During the mid-morning, students and government employees ordered two or three kinds of dim sum and ate as they read their newspapers. In the late morning, people working at small businesses visited restaurants for breakfast and to use the restaurant as a small office space.

By the late 1930s, Guangzhou's teahouse culture included four high-profile dim sum chefs, with signs at the front doors of their restaurants. There was heavy competition among teahouses, and as a result, new varieties of dim sum were invented almost daily, including dishes influenced by the tea pastries of Shanghai, Beijing, and the Western world. Many new fusion dishes were also created, including puddings, baked rolls, turnovers, custard tarts, and Malay steamed cakes.

There were also significant increases in the variety of thin wrappers used in both sweet and savory items.If we concentrate only on the changes and developments in the variety of wrappers, the main types of dim sum wrappers during the 1920s included such things as raised (for filled buns), wheat starch, shao mai (i.e., egg dough), crystal bun, crispy batter, sticky rice, and boiled dumpling wrappers. By the 1930s, the varieties of wrappers commonly used by chefs included puff pastry, Cantonese short pastry, and so on, for a total of 23 types that were prepared by pan-frying, deep-frying, steaming, baking, and roasting.As the Chinese Civil War progressed from 1927 to 1949, many dim sum chefs left China and settled in Hong Kong, resulting in further refinements and innovations of the dim sum there. Very large dim sum restaurants in major cities like Hong Kong, San Francisco, Boston, Toronto, and New York were also established.

In the nineteenth century, Cantonese immigrants brought dim sum to the west and east coasts of the United States. Some of the earliest dim sum restaurants in the U.S. still operating today opened in the 1920s in San Francisco and New York City. The history of San Francisco's Chinese community is believed to have started about 30 years before the first dim sum restaurant opened in the city's Chinatown neighborhood. The Chinese preferred to live in the present Chinatown area because of its restaurants and theatres. In the late 1930s, some early U.S. newspaper references to dim sum began to appear. While some Chinese restaurants in the U.S. had offered dim sum for decades, it was not until the late 1980s that there was a broader public awareness of dim sum.

Although there was increased awareness of dim sum around this time, one chef from Hong Kong, who immigrated to San Francisco, noted that diners in the U.S. usually focused on the food itself and not the communal aspects of eating dim sum. Although dim sum is a Chinese meal, it is a communal dining and social experience that can span hours. It is customary for large groups to enjoy dishes together as a leisurely social activity. Diners go to restaurants early, around 10:00 AM, and rather than ordering a whole table of food, they order small amounts, have a cup of tea, read the newspaper, and wait for friends and family to join them. As a result, a visit to a dim sum restaurant can last from late morning well into the afternoon. For some people in Hong Kong, eating dim sum is a daily routine and a way of life. Since this dim sum tradition is not always present in some U.S. dim sum restaurants, however, approaches to generate interest and attract customers include customized seasoning and flavors of traditional dishes, as well as creating novel dishes with an emphasis on enhanced flavors and visual appeal.

One food reviewer notes that there has been an increase in popularity in posting dim sum photos on social media feeds, and that dim sum has become so popular that every U.S. state now has at least one high-quality dim sum restaurant. There is a restaurant, bar, and highly rated dance club complex in Las Vegas, NV, that features high-end Cantonese food (including dim sum), craft cocktails, dinner parties, and prominent disc jockeys in a chic setting.

The dim sum restaurants in Chicago's Chinatown serve mainly traditional dim sum dishes, but there has been recent growth in contemporary dim sum with new fusion dishes, as well as restaurants now located outside Chinatown.

In Hong Kong, many chefs are also introducing variants based on traditional Cantonese cuisine, which generates interest and provides both Hongkongers and tourists with new, fresh dim sum dishes.

Modern dim sum 
In addition to traditional dim sum, some chefs also create and prepare new fusion-based dim sum dishes.  Modern versions of buns include pork belly steamed buns with cucumber, green onion, cilantro, and ginger hoisin sauce, cocoa mushroom buns, chili lamb buns.  Dumplings include snow pea shoot and shrimp dumplings, and chili crab with fried garlic, siu mai with pork, shrimp, scallop, and caviar, dumplings stuffed with shrimp and peanut, dumplings with South Australian scallop, garoupa (grouper), caviar, gold leaf, and egg white, and bone marrow or beef short ribs in potstickers.  Pastry puff dishes include Australian Wagyu beef puff, Assam curry chicken puff, pumpkin puffs. Toast dishes include Hong Kong style French toast with condensed milk and peanut butter and prawn toast.  Additional examples are spring rolls filled with goat and duck skin and duck hearts cooked over a wood-fired grill and served with sesame-horseradish sauce.

One AAA four diamond award-winning Chinese restaurant in Miami Beach has a prix-fixe dim sum menu, prix-fixe "yum cha" menu and breakfast cocktails.  Variations designed for visual appeal on social media, such as dumplings and buns made to resemble animals and fictional characters, also exist. Dim sum chefs have previously used cocoa powder as coloring to create steamed bread puffs to appear like forest mushrooms, espresso powder as both flavoring and coloring for deep-fried riblets, as well as pastry cream, and French puffs to create innovative dishes while paying tribute to the history of dim sum.

Fast food 
Dim sum can often be purchased from grocery stores in major cities. They can be cooked easily by steaming, frying, or microwaving. Major grocery stores in Hong Kong, Vietnam, the Philippines, Singapore, Taiwan, China, Indonesia, Malaysia, Brunei, Thailand, Australia, the United States and Canada stock a variety of frozen or fresh dim sum. These include dumplings, shumai, pork buns, and others.

In Hong Kong and other cities in Asia, dim sum can be purchased from convenience stores, coffee shops and other eateries. Halal-certified dim sum that uses chicken instead of pork is very popular in Hong Kong, Malaysia, Indonesia and Brunei.

Restaurants 

Some Cantonese restaurants serve dim sum as early as five in the morning, while more traditional restaurants typically serve dim sum from mid-morning until mid-afternoon. It is common for restaurants to serve dim sum during dinner as well as for takeout.

Dim sum is served using a unique serving method whereby servers offer dishes to customers from carts, including some carts that are steam-heated. Diners often prefer tables nearest the kitchen since servers and carts pass by these tables first. Many restaurants place lazy susans on tables to help diners reach food and tea.

The pricing of dishes at these types of restaurants may vary, but traditionally they are classified as "small", "medium", "large", "extra-large", or "special". Servers record orders with a rubber stamp or an ink pen on a bill card that remains on the table. Servers in some restaurants use distinctive stamps to track sales statistics for each server. When they have finished eating, the customer calls the server over, and their bill is calculated based on the number of stamps or quantities marked in each priced section.

Another way of pricing the food that was consumed uses the number and color of the dishes left on the table. Some restaurants offer a new approach by using a conveyor belt format.

Other Cantonese restaurants may take orders from a pre-printed sheet of paper and serve à la carte, much like Spanish tapas restaurants, to provide fresh, cooked-to-order dim sum or because of real estate and resource constraints.

See also
 Cantonese cuisine
 Chinese cuisine
 Dim sim, Australian dumpling inspired by dim sum, with origins in local Cantonese restaurants.
 Hong Kong cuisine
 List of brunch foods
 List of dumplings

References

Sources

 Phillips, Carolyn (2006) The Dim Sum Field Guide: A Taxonomy of Dumplings, Buns, Meats, Sweets, and Other Specialties of the Chinese Teahouse. New York: Crown Publishing Group

External links 

 
Breakfast
Cantonese cuisine
Cantonese words and phrases
Dumplings
Fast food
Hong Kong cuisine
Malaysian cuisine
National dishes
Philippine cuisine
Serving and dining
Singaporean cuisine
Street food
Taiwanese cuisine
Vietnamese cuisine
Tea culture
Yum cha